Jerry Pimm is an American former basketball coach.  He served as the head men's basketball coach at the University of Utah from 1974 to 1983 and the University of California, Santa Barbara from 1983 to 1998, compiling career college basketball coaching record of 395–288.

Playing career

Playing for Montebello High School, Pimm earned the Helms Athletic Foundation's Central Section co-high school player of the year in 1956. He played at Fullerton Junior College in 1956-1958. He then played guard at the University of Southern California, where he earned second-team All-Athletic Association of Western Universities and All-Coast Team honors in 1960.

Coaching career

Pimm replaced former Utah coach Bill Foster, who had accepted the same position with the Duke University Blue Devils, in 1974 after serving 13 years as an assistant coach under Jack Gardner and Foster. As coach of the Utes, Pimm led Utah to a 173-86 (.668) record, including four Sweet 16 appearances in the NCAA tournament. The Utes also won 3 Western Athletic Conference basketball titles and only had one losing season during his stay. In 1981, the Utes lost to eventual champion North Carolina, led by Sam Perkins, Al Wood, James Worthy and Michael Jordan. The Utes were led by Danny Vranes, Tom Chambers and Karl Bankowski. In the 1983 NCAA Men's basketball tournament, Pimm's Utes were seeded 10th in the west regional, but led by Peter Williams and Pace Mannion, Utah upset 7th seed Illinois and 2nd seed UCLA before losing to eventual champion North Carolina State. After the season, Pimm decided to leave the University of Utah for the University of California, Santa Barbara.

Prior to Pimm's career at UCSB, the Gauchos program had suffered through seven straight losing seasons. After a shaky start, which saw three more losing seasons, the Gauchos turned it around in the 1986-87 season, where they finished with a 16-13 record. The next season would be Pimm's best at UCSB. Led by conference player of the year Brian Shaw, the Gauchos went 22-8, including an 18-point win over Jim Valvano's North Carolina State team (with Chucky Brown, Charles Shackleford, and Vinny Del Negro), and two wins over Jerry Tarkanian's UNLV Runnin' Rebels (the second win coming when UNLV was ranked #2). UCSB earned its first-ever NCAA Tournament berth, but they lost to the University of Maryland in the first round, 92-82.

In 1990, UCSB once again made the NCAA Tournament (propelled by a 78-70 win over top-ranked and eventual national champion UNLV), this time beating the University of Houston 70-66 in the first round before falling to #1 seed Michigan State 62-58 points in the 2nd round. Under Pimm, UCSB also played in three National Invitation Tournaments. In the mid-late 90s, UCSB had suffered through five straight losing seasons, and Pimm resigned, although he later took a job with the athletic department. Pimm went 217-187 (.537) in 16 seasons with the Gauchos. He holds an all-time record of 390-273 (.588) in 25 years as a head coach.

Pimm assisted Lute Olson with the US national team at the 1986 Goodwill Games and the 1986 FIBA World Championship, winning the gold medal both times.

Jamie Dixon and Ben Howland both were assistant coaches for Pimm while at UCSB.

Head coaching record

References

Year of birth missing (living people)
Living people
American men's basketball coaches
American men's basketball players
Basketball coaches from California
Basketball players from California
College men's basketball head coaches in the United States
Guards (basketball)
Junior college men's basketball players in the United States
UC Santa Barbara Gauchos men's basketball coaches
USC Trojans men's basketball coaches
USC Trojans men's basketball players
Utah Utes men's basketball coaches